Penn Yan Central School District is a school district in Penn Yan, New York, United States. The superintendent is Mr. Howard Dennis. The district operates three schools: Penn Yan Academy, Penn Yan Middle School, and Penn Yan Elementary School.

Administration offices
The district offices are located at 1 School Drive. The current superintendent is Howard Dennis.

Selected former superintendents 
Mr. Willard F. Joslyn
Mr. Carl W. Thompson
Dr. Michael Thompson–?-1986
Mr. Daniel Farsaci
Dr. Gloria C. Carroll 1992-1999
Dr. Gene M. Spanneut–?-2004 (unknown, retired)
Ms. Tiffany Phillips [interim]–2004-2005
Ms. Ann E. Orman–2005-2011 (Assistant Superintendent of Curriculum/Instruction - Geneva City School District, retired)
Mr. Thomas A. Cox–2011 [interim] (Deputy Superintendent - Monroe 1 BOCES, named Interim Superintendent of Lyndonville Central School District)
Mr. David S. Hamilton–Superintendent–2011-2014 (Director of Instruction - Churchville-Chili Central School District, named Superintendent of Baldwinsville Central School District)

Penn Yan Academy

Penn Yan Academy is located at 305 Court Street and serves grades 9 through 12. The current principal is Mr. David Pullen, and the current assistant principals are Mr. Warren Kinsey and Mr. Johnathan MacKerchar.

History

Selected former principals
Previous assignment and previous assignment denoted in parentheses
Mr. William Joslyn
Mr. O. Roger Killian–?-1962
Mr. David Durkee–1962-1972 (Principal - Averill Park High School, named Director of Guidance for Penn Yan Academy)
Mr. Glenn W. Bronson–1972-1988 (Principal - Delcastle Technical High School, placed on special assignment)
Mr. Thomas A. Rakovan–1988-1997 (Principal - West Genesee High School, retired)
Mr. Keith E. Mathews–1997-2009 (Principal - Cayuga/Onondaga BOCES, retired)

Penn Yan Middle School

Penn Yan Middle School is located at 515 Liberty Street and serves grades 6 through 8. The current principal is Mrs. Kelley Johnson.

History

Selected former principals
Previous assignment and reason for denoted in parentheses
Mr. John R. Barry
Mr. Shirley Callison (Unknown, named Special Projects Coordinator for Penn Yan Central School District)
Mr. Richard Rodriguez–1986-1988 (Assistant Principal - Penn Yan Academy, named Superintendent of Forestville Central School)
Mr. M. Douglas Zoller–1988-1989 (Superintendent - Seneca Falls Central School District, retired)
Ms. Billie Bauman–1989-1996 (Unknown, named Principal of Watkins Glen Elementary)
Ms. Linda J. Raide–1996-2007 (Unknown, retired)
Mr. David Pullen–2007-2009 (Principal - Geneva High School, named Principal of Penn Yan Academy)
Mrs. Rebecca Perrault–2009-2012 (Vice Principal - Penn Yan Academy, named Director of Student Information for Penn Yan Central Schools)
Dr. Howard Dennis–2012-2013 (Associate Superintendent - Penn Yan Central School District, returned to position)

Penn Yan Elementary

Penn Yan Elementary is located at 3 School Drive and serves grades K through 5. The current principal is Mr. Edward Foote, and the current assistant principal is Mrs Kelly Dallos.

History

Selected former principals
Previous assignment and reason for departure denoted in parentheses
Mr. Elmer A. Willard
Mr. Richard T. Brow–?-1986 (Vice Principal - Penn Yan Elementary, retired)
Mr. Matthew D. Herz–1996-2005 (Vice Principal - Penn Yan Elementary, named Elementary Principal of Canastota Central School District)
Mr. Thomas A. Cox–2005-2006 (interim)
Mr. Edward W. Bronson–2006-2011 (Assistant Principal - Penn Yan Elementary, retired)
Ms. Marcie F. Ware–2011-2013 (Assistant Principal - Penn Yan Elementary, named Principal of Canandaigua Elementary School)

Selected former administrators

St. Michael School

St. Michael School is a parochial school located at 214 Keuka Street and serves grades PK through 5. The current principal is Mr. Tom Flood.

History
The school was founded in 1882.

Selected former principals
Previous assignment and previous assignment denoted in parentheses
Sr. Anne Maura Morris
Sr. Catherine Gibbons
Mrs. Jo Ann Struck–?-2005
Dr. James P. Tette–2005-2009 (Computer teacher - St. Michael's School, retired)
Mr. David M. Paddock–2009-2012 (Principal - Fairport High School, retired)

References

External links
Official site

Education in Yates County, New York
School districts in New York (state)